Lobaria quercizans or Ricasolia quercizans, commonly known as the smooth lungwort, is a macrolichen in the family Peltigeraceae. It forms large, smooth, grey (pale green when wet) growths that often have abundant red-brown apothecia.

Distribution
Most records are from eastern North America but there are also isolated probable location records from South America (Bolivia), eastern Asia (China, Korea, Russian Manchuria). In eastern North America, it is found from Newfoundland to northern Georgia and west to eastern Minnesota. An outlying population is found in the Ouachita Mountains.

Ecology
In eastern North America, L. quercizans is found primarily on the bark of deciduous trees, usually maples (Acer species). In the southern parts of its range A. saccharum (sugar maple) is preferred. Further north, where there is less A. saccharum, A. rubrum (red maple) is favoured.

Uses
The lichen is used for food and medicine by the Menomini people of Wisconsin.

References

External links

USDA plant profile

Lobaria
Lichen species
Lichens of North America
Lichens of Bolivia
Lichens described in 1803
Lichens of Asia
Taxa named by André Michaux